Belleview is an unincorporated community in Monroe Township, Jefferson County, Indiana.

The community and post office was originally called Mud Lick until residents changed the name to the more pleasant-sounding Belleview. The Belleview post office was discontinued in 1906, having existed since 1855.

Geography

References

External links
Custer, Reuel.  “Reminiscences of a Jefferson County Pioneer”, Madison Courier, (April 25, 1913), via “Jefferson County Local History”, Jefferson County Public Library, Jefferson County, Indiana.

Unincorporated communities in Jefferson County, Indiana
Unincorporated communities in Indiana